Jaelen Strong (born January 25, 1994) is an American football wide receiver who is a free agent. He played college football at Arizona State.

Early years
Strong's father, John Rankin, played college basketball at Drexel and died of leukemia in 2003 when Strong was 9. Strong attended West Catholic Preparatory High School in Philadelphia, Pennsylvania, where he played football and ran track. As a junior, he caught 24 passes for 385 yards with four touchdowns. As a senior, he had 17 receptions for 318 yards and four touchdowns. He had scholarship offers from Eastern Michigan, Villanova and VMI before opting to attend Pierce College. In track & field, Strong posted personal-bests of 6.42 meters (20-11.5) in the long jump and 12.42 meters (40-6.5) in the triple jump.

College career
Strong attended Los Angeles Pierce College for two years before transferring to Arizona State University. At Pierce in 2012, he had 67 receptions for 1,263 yards and 15 touchdowns in 10 games. In his first season at Arizona State in 2013, he had 75 receptions for 1,122 yards and seven touchdowns. In 2014, he had 82 receptions for 1,165 yards and 10 touchdowns.

After his junior season, Strong entered the 2015 NFL Draft.

Professional career
Coming into the draft, Strong was ranked by some analysts as a late first-round prospect. He had been criticized for his lack of vertical speed, but surprised many with a 4.44 40-yard dash at the NFL Combine. His vertical jump of 42 inches was the 4th best among wide receivers over the past ten years.

Houston Texans
Strong was selected by the Houston Texans with the 70th overall pick in the third round of the 2015 NFL Draft. The Texans traded with the New York Jets for the pick, giving away their own third round pick (82nd overall, Jets picked Lorenzo Mauldin), their fifth round pick (152nd overall, Jets picked Jarvis Harrison), a seventh round pick via the Cleveland Browns (229th overall, Jets traded pick to Jacksonville Jaguars), and wide receiver DeVier Posey.  Against the Indianapolis Colts on October 8, 2015, he made his first two career receptions, both for touchdowns; the first was on a 42-yard hail mary pass to end the first half. He finished his rookie season with 14 receptions for 161 yards and three touchdowns.

In Week 8 of the 2016 season, Strong suffered a serious ankle sprain against the Lions. The injury kept him out the next five weeks before being placed on injured reserve on December 10, 2016. He finished his second season with 14 receptions for 131 yards with no touchdowns in eight games.

Strong was suspended the first game of the 2017 season for violating the NFL Policy and Program for Substances of Abuse.

On September 18, 2017, Strong was released by the Texans.

Jacksonville Jaguars
On September 19, 2017, Strong was claimed off waivers by the Jacksonville Jaguars. He was released by the Jaguars on November 18, 2017 and was re-signed to the practice squad. He was promoted to the active roster on December 23, 2017. In Week 16, Strong caught three passes for 38 yards and a touchdown. However, he suffered a torn ACL in the game and was placed on injured reserve on December 26, 2017. He was released on April 30, 2018.

Cleveland Browns
After spending the 2018 season out of the NFL, Strong was signed by the Cleveland Browns on February 20, 2019.

Strong was waived by the Browns on August 27, 2019.

Personal life
On February 28, 2016, Strong was arrested in Scottsdale, Arizona for marijuana possession. He was later released from jail.

References

External links
 
 Arizona State Sun Devils bio 

1994 births
Living people
Players of American football from Philadelphia
American football wide receivers
Pierce Brahmas football players
Arizona State Sun Devils football players
Houston Texans players
Jacksonville Jaguars players
Cleveland Browns players